Mawuli School is a co-educational, boarding senior high school located in Ho in the Ho Municipal district in the Volta Region of Ghana.

History
The school was founded in 1950 by the Evangelical Presbyterian Church. It was the first senior high school to be established in the Trans-Volta Togoland.
The name Mawuli, which is a popular Ewe name in Volta Region means "There is a God". The name Mawuli and the motto Head Heart Hand, was given by students.

Programmes offered 

 Business
 General arts
 General science
 Home economics
 Technical skills (Auto Mechanics and Electricals)
 Visual arts
Graphics
Ceramics
General Agriculture

Notable alumni 

 Selase Agbenyefia – Ghanaian helicopter pilot
 Nelson Agbesi – Volta Regional Minister (1979–1980), Minister for Agriculture (1980–1981)
 Samuel Koku Anyidoho – Deputy General-Secretary of the National Democratic Congress (2014–2018)
Akofa Edjeani Asiedu – Ghanaian actresss
Oscar Korbla Mawuli Awuku – Ghanaian body artist, painter, and sculptor 
 Akua Sena Dansua – Ghanaian journalist and politician
 Leila Djansi – Ghanaian filmmaker
Harry Dumashie - Chief of the Defence Staff, Chief of Air Staff and member of the Provisional National Defence Council
 Smile Dzisi – rector and interim vice-chancellor of the Koforidua Technical University
 Bernice Heloo – MP Hohoe North and former deputy Minister for Environment Science, Technology and Innovations
 Jerry Kuma – vice-chancellor of the University of Mines and Technology
Efo Kodjo Mawugbe – Ghanaian award-winning playwright and former director of the National Theatre of Ghana 
 Elizabeth Akua Ohene – Ghanaian journalist

Gallery of School

See also

 Education in Ghana
 List of senior high schools in Ghana

References

1950 establishments in Gold Coast (British colony)
Boarding schools in Ghana
Christian schools in Ghana
Co-educational boarding schools
Educational institutions established in 1950
High schools in Ghana
Presbyterian schools in Africa
Education in Volta Region

External links 

 Official website